Glyphipterix tungella is a species of sedge moth in the genus Glyphipterix. It is endemic to New Zealand.

Taxonomy 
G. tungella was first described by Cajetan Felder, Rudolf Felder and Alois Friedrich Rogenhofer in 1875. Meyrick also described the species in 1880 under the name Glyphipterix asteronota. Philpott did the same in 1916 under the name Glyphipterix plagigera. These latter two names were synonymised by John Dugdale in 1988.

Description 
This species has a forewing length of between 3.5mm and 5mm.

Distribution and habitat 
This day flying moth is common throughout New Zealand where it can be seen during the months of October to January. It prefers sheltered shrub or grassy areas and forest clearings.

References

External links

Image of live moth in iNaturalist

Moths described in 1875
Glyphipterigidae
Moths of New Zealand
Endemic fauna of New Zealand
Endemic moths of New Zealand